James Thomas Alfred Blackburn (20 July 1878 – 13 March 1951), known as Fred Blackburn, was an English footballer who played in the Football League for Blackburn Rovers and in the Southern League for West Ham United.

Blackburn played for his home-town club of Blackburn Rovers, playing as an outside-left, and featured for the team at the age of 17.

He was capped three times for England, making his international debut at Crystal Palace against Scotland, in which he scored in a 2–2 draw. He also represented the English League against the Scottish League and played in a North versus South fixture.

He moved to West Ham United in the summer of 1905, along with Blackburn teammates Lionel Watson and Harry Hindle, and switched to wing-half while with the club. He was an ever-present during the 1909–10 season and totalled 237 Southern League appearances for the club, scoring 24 goals, before leaving in 1913.

After retiring from the game, Blackburn joined the Merchant Navy, but later returned to football to coach Barking.

His brother Arthur made a handful of appearances for Blackburn Rovers and for Southampton as a full-back.

References

External links
Fred Blackburn at westhamstats.info

1878 births
1951 deaths
Footballers from Blackburn
English footballers
England international footballers
Association football wingers
Blackburn Rovers F.C. players
West Ham United F.C. players
British Merchant Navy personnel
English Football League players
English Football League representative players
Southern Football League players